Dhopapara High School is a secondary school in the center of Dhopapara, a village at Puthia in Rajshahi. It was established in 1988.

Schools in Rajshahi District